In mathematics, the maximum-minimums identity is a relation between the maximum element of a set S of n numbers and the minima of the 2n − 1 non-empty subsets of S.

Let S = {x1, x2, ..., xn}.  The identity states that 

or conversely

For a probabilistic proof, see the reference.

See also 

 Inclusion–exclusion principle
 Maxima and minima#In relation to sets

References
 

Mathematical identities